Sciapode is a French film production and distribution company headquartered in Paris.  Founded in 2003, the company specializes in producing European feature films, both fictional and documentary, blending different genres and art forms.

History

Emilie Blézat founded Sciapode in 2003 to produce films by "strong and ambitious filmmakers." Her first production, Blush, a 2005 choreographic film directed by Wim Vandekeybus, met with public and critical acclaim. Encouraged by this experience, she produced films such as Michaël R. Roskam's The One Thing To Do (2005), Victoire Terminus, a 2008 documentary directed by Florent de la Tullaye and Renaud Barret (officially selected at the 2008 Berlin Film Festival), and Andrew Kötting's 2009 film, Ivul, which was selected at the Locarno International Film Festivals and at the Busan Film Festival. In 2010, two Sciapode productions premiered at the Cannes International Film Festival: Sophie Fiennes’ Over Your Cities Grass Will Grow in the official selection, and David Dusa’s Flowers of Evil as part of the ACID selection. Both were subsequently entered in numerous festivals around the world. Sciapode also co-produced Valerianne Poidevin’s L’Oiseau Sans Pattes (selected at the Cinéma du Réel Festival, held at the Pompidou Centre, as well as the “Vision Du Réel” Festival in Nyon) and Rain, by Anne Teresa de Keersmaeker, Olivia Rochette and Gerard-Jan Claes.

Along with film work, Sciapode also produces works of performance art, like Wayn Traub’s opera, Le Comeback de Jean-Baptiste, orchestrated by Hervé Niquet and DJ crew Birdy Nam Nam, and David Dusa’s and Mike Sens’ L’Emeute des Emotions for the Temps d'Images Arte Festival.

The company is named after the sciapods of Greek mythology.

Filmography

International TV series

 2019 : Paradise Institute - tv series in development
 2019 : Warm Blood Cold Snow - tv series in development
 2019 : Violence Within - tv series in development
 2019 : Hasugi : animated tv series in development

Feature films

 2019 : Get Lucky by David Dusa starring Rhydian Vaughan (Feng XiaoYue) - in development
 2018 : His Master's Voice by György Pálfi
 2017 : Grace Jones: Bloodlight and Bami  by Sophie Fiennes
 2015 : Galloping Mind by Wim Vandekeybus (Associate Producer)
 2014 : Szabadesés (Free Fall) by György Pálfi
 2013 : Mary Queen of Scots by Thomas Imbach

 
 2010 : Over Your Cities Grass Will Grow by Sophie Fiennes
 2010 : Flowers of evil by David Dusa
 2009 :  by Andrew Kötting
 2008 : Victoire Terminus by Florent de La Tullaye & Renaud Barret
 2006 : Here After by Wim Vandekeybus (Associate Producer)
 2005 : Blush by Wim Vandekeybus

Feature Documentaries 

 2012 : Rain by Olivia Rochette, Gérard-Jan Clues & Anne Teresa De Keersmaeker
2012 : L'Oiseau sans pattes by Valérianne Poidevin
2008 : The Moon, The Sea, The Mood by Philipp Mayrhoffer & Christian Kobald
2007 : La Vie de Château by Frédérique Devillez

Short films 

 2009 : Emeutes des Emotions by David Dusa
 2009 : Wild Beast by David Dusa
 2009 : Rushes Instables by Mike Sens & David Dusa
 2008 : Distances by David Dusa
 2007 : Amin by David Dusa
 2007 : C-Song Variations by 
 2006 : The One thing to do by Michael R. Roskam

Stage Opera

Films distributed by Sciapode
 2012 : Flowers of Evil by David Dusa
 2003 : Guerra by Pippo Delbono

DVD releases
 2006 : Anthologie by Wim Vandekeybus - 3 DVD Boxset
 2005 : Maria-Dolorès by Wayn Traub

References

External link

Allociné

Film production companies of France
Mass media in Paris
French companies established in 2003
Mass media companies established in 2003